The 2015 Cure Bowl was a postseason American college football bowl game played on December 19, 2015 at Orlando Citrus Bowl in Orlando, Florida. The first edition of the Cure Bowl featured the San Jose State Spartans of the Mountain West Conference against the Georgia State Panthers of the Sun Belt Conference. It began at 7:00 p.m. EST and aired on CBS Sports Network.  It was the one of the 2015–16 bowl games that concluded the 2015 FBS football season. Sponsored by automotive retailer AutoNation, the game was officially known as the AutoNation Cure Bowl.

Teams
The game featured the San Jose State Spartans against the Georgia State Panthers.  It was the first overall meeting between the two schools.

San Jose State Spartans

Because the Spartans finished 5–7 in their regular season, they would ordinarily be bowl-ineligible.  However, only 77 teams finished at .500 or better on the season, leaving three bowl slots open to 5–7 teams based on their Academic Progress Rate (APR).  The Spartans ranked fourth among such teams, after Nebraska and Missouri and together with Minnesota. However, since Missouri did not accept a bowl bid, the Spartans were invited to the Cure Bowl, which they accepted.

This was the Spartans' tenth bowl game (with a 6–3 all-time record in bowl games) and their first since the 2012 Military Bowl, where they defeated Bowling Green by a score of 29–20.

Georgia State Panthers

After finishing 6–6 in their regular season, bowl director Alan Gooch extended an invitation for the Panthers to play in the game, which they accepted.

This was the first bowl game in school history for Georgia State, seven years after football was approved, five years after they kicked off, and two years after joining the Football Bowl Subdivision. This ties the record for a team going from conception to a bowl berth, set the season prior by South Alabama.

Game summary

Scoring Summary

Source:

Statistics

References

Cure Bowl
Cure Bowl
Cure Bowl
Georgia State Panthers football bowl games
San Jose State Spartans football bowl games
2010s in Orlando, Florida